Kat Tenbarge is an American journalist, who is currently working as a tech and culture reporter for NBC News after previously working as a senior reporter at Insider. She specializes in reporting on internet culture and influencers, including her own views and commentary. Tenbarge has reported on several cases of sexual assault allegations against Internet personalities, and her work and views concerning internet culture are frequently cited in other publications.

Early life and career
Tenbarge studied journalism at Ohio University, where she was also the editor-in-chief of one of the school's student publications, The New Political. While at Ohio University she majored in environmental studies and journalism, winning regional first place in news reporting from the Society of Professional Journalists in 2017, and received a $4,000 grant from the White House Correspondents' Association the same year.

Career 
In October 2020, Tenbarge reported on sexual assault allegations against Jeffree Star, after she was approached with the allegations by the accuser unprompted. In January 2021, she reported on allegations of child grooming against YouTuber CallMeCarson.

On March 26, 2021, Tenbarge reported on the alleged rape of a woman in 2018 during the filming of a video by David Dobrik. The incident was reported to have taken place while the woman was inebriated, and was allegedly committed by Dom Zeglaitis, who was at the time a member of Dobrik's Vlog Squad. The woman had agreed to work with Tenbarge, who said that she had been waiting for an outlet that would allow her anonymity. This report resulted in widespread backlash against Dobrik, including the withdrawal of support from several sponsors of his YouTube channel, and ultimately resulted in him stepping down from his position at Dispo.

On December 2, 2021, Tenbarge announced on social media she would be a tech and culture reporter for NBC News which will end her previous employment with Insider.
 As an NBC News reporter, she later wrote about, with Tyler Kingkade, the charging of Justin Roiland with felony domestic battery and false imprisonment in Orange County, California, in connection with an alleged incident in 2020. She has also written about Amber Heard, Elon Musk, Ye, Angelina Jolie, the arrest of influencer Andrew Tate, the Russo-Ukrainian War, and other topics as an NBC News reporter.

Tenbarge also runs a newsletter called The Kids Aren't Alright, published through Substack.

References

External links 

 Kat Tenbarge on Muck Rack
The Kids Aren't Alright

American journalists
Ohio University alumni
Living people
Year of birth missing (living people)